Alcidion ramulorum is a species of longhorn beetles of the subfamily Lamiinae. It was described by Henry Walter Bates in 1864, and is known from Brazil.

References

Beetles described in 1864
Alcidion